The S-13 is a 122 mm calibre unguided rocket weapon developed by the Soviet Air Force for use by military aircraft. It remains in service with the Russian Air Force and some other countries.

Development 
The S-13 rocket was developed in the 1970s to meet requirements for a penetrating weapon capable of cratering runways and penetrating hardened aircraft shelters, bunkers and pillboxes, to fill a gap between 80 mm and 240 mm rockets and fulfill a role similar to the 127 mm Zuni rocket. The S-13 is conventional in layout, with a solid rocket motor and folding tail fins that provide stability after launch.

The first trials were in 1973, but it was introduced only in 1983. S-13 rockets are shot from 5-tube launchers B-13L, that can be carried by most of Soviet and Russian attack and new fighter aircraft, like Sukhoi Su-17/20/22, Sukhoi Su-24, Sukhoi Su-25, Sukhoi Su-27, MiG-23BN, MiG-27, MiG-29. B-13L1 launcher is used by helicopters such as Mil Mi-24, Mil Mi-28, Kamov Ka-29TB, Kamov Ka-50 and Kamov Ka-52. S-13 rocket system has been accepted for operation on Sukhoi Su-30MK2, Sukhoi Su-24M, Sukhoi Su-25, Sukhoi Su-35, Yakovlev Yak-130, MiG-29BM, Mil Mi-28N.

Launcher specifications

Rocket specifications

See also
 S-8 rocket
 S-24 rocket
 Ugroza, a proposed upgrade of "dumb" rockets to salvo-fired laser-guided precision missiles

References

 Soviet/Russian Aircraft Weapons Since World War Two, Yefim Gordon, 
 Mil Mi-24 Hind Attack Helicopter, Yefim Gordon and Dimitri Komissarov, 
 Jane's Air Launched Weapons Issue 36, Duncan Lennox, 
 Robert Grzęda: Npr S-13 i wyrzutnia B-13L in: Aeroplan nr. 1(58)/2006 (in Polish)

External links
 http://www.airrecognition.com/index.php/archive-world-worldwide-news-air-force-aviation-aerospace-air-military-defence-industry/global-defense-security-news/global-news-2018/september/4531-russian-combat-helicopters-to-receive-new-s-13df-unguided-rockets.html
 http://worldweapon.ru/vertuski/s13.php - photos (and description in Russian)

Air-to-ground rockets of the Soviet Union
Military equipment introduced in the 1970s